Fay is a ghost town in Lincoln County, Nevada, United States.

The Fay post office was in operation from September 1900 until July 1924.

In 1910, the population of the Fay precinct was 99.

Notable people
Darr H. Alkire, United States Air Force general, was born in Fay.

External links
 Fay (ghosttowns.com)

References 

Ghost towns in Lincoln County, Nevada
Ghost towns in Nevada